Zill-e-Huma Usman (September 16, 1971 – February 20, 2007) was a Pakistani politician and activist for women's rights. She served as a minister in the military dictatorship of Pervez Musharraf.

Education
Zill-e-Huma got a degree of LLB in 1997 and later she did her master's degree in political science from University of the Punjab, Lahore.

Career 
Usman married Dr Muhammad Usman Haider. She was mother of two minor boys. She was the only member of family for political participation.
She was member of political party, Pakistan Muslim League (Q).

In the 2002 Pakistani general election, Usman ran for the seat of the Punjab Assembly and got high number of votes. From 2003 to 2006, she served as the Parliamentary Secretary for Development and Planning. In 2006, she was appointed as the Social Welfare Minister for women.

Death
While serving as the provincial minister for social welfare in Punjab, she was shot and killed on February 20, 2007 in Gujranwala, 70 km (43 miles) north of Lahore, where she was meeting her party members when a man among the participants, opened fire on her head. Usman was admitted to a local hospital in Gujranwala but then airlifted to Lahore, but she died during the surgery.

Her assassin, Mohammed Sarwar, was reported to have been motivated by her refusal to abide by the Islamic code of dress and a dislike for the involvement of women in political affairs. The killer had previously been jailed in connection with the killing and mutilation of four prostitutes and told a television channel “I will kill all those women who do not follow the right path, if I am freed again”. On March 20, 2007, Sarwar was sentenced to death. he died in Central Jail Lahore on January 27, 2012.

Participation of women in political activities as a candidate and a voter has always been a challenge in Pakistan, whether this is the case of Fatima Jinnah, Benazir Bhutto, Malala Yousafzai, Wranga Loni or Zill-e-Huma Usman.

See also
Islamic feminism

References

External links
The Australian Pakistani minister killed for refusing to wear veil.
APP Zille Huma Usman assassinated.

1971 births
2007 deaths
Pakistani politicians
Pakistani feminists
Assassinated Pakistani politicians
Deaths by firearm in Pakistan
Proponents of Islamic feminism
Pakistani Muslims
People murdered in Pakistan
Victims of serial killers